Tsakalotos is a Greek surname. It is the surname of:

 Euclid Tsakalotos (born 1960), current Greek Minister of Finance
 Thrasyvoulos Tsakalotos (1897–1989), former Chief of the Hellenic Army General Staff

Greek-language surnames
Surnames